Ștefan Ströck (born 11 February 1901 – 15 February 1991) was a Romanian football player. He competed in the men's tournament at the 1924 Summer Olympics.

References

External links

1901 births
1991 deaths
Romanian footballers
Romania international footballers
Liga I players
Liga II players
Stăruința Oradea players
CA Oradea players
AS CFR Brașov players
Olympic footballers of Romania
Footballers at the 1924 Summer Olympics
Sportspeople from Oradea
Association football goalkeepers